Major-General Godfrey Charles Mundy (10 March 1804 – 10 July 1860) was a British Army officer who became Lieutenant Governor of Jersey.

Military career
Mundy was commissioned as a lieutenant in the British Army in 1821. He took part in the Siege of Bharatpur in the Indian princely state of Baharatpur in 1825 before being made Deputy Adjutant General of the military forces in Australia in 1826. He was appointed Assistant Under Secretary at the Colonial Office from March to September 1854. He served as Permanent Under Secretary in the War Office during the Crimean War and was appointed Lieutenant Governor of Jersey in 1857. He died in office in 1860. He was author of the book Our Antipodes: or, Residence and Rambles in the Australasian Colonies, with a glimpse of the Gold-Fields.

Family
In 1848 he married Lady Louisa Catherine Georgina Herbert; they had one son, Herbert Godfrey Mundy.

References

1804 births
1860 deaths
British Army generals
Governors of Jersey